Block Music is the second solo studio album by American rapper Shawnna. It was released on June 6, 2006 on Def Jam South Recordings and Disturbing tha Peace. Production was handled by several record producers, including Vudu, 110% Pure, Chucky Thompson, J.U.S.T.I.C.E. League and Salaam Remi. It features guest appearances from Buddy Guy, Ludacris, Avant, Bobby V, I-20, Johnny P., Lil Wayne, Malik Yusef, Pharrell Williams, Shareefa, Smoke of Field Mob, Syleena Johnson, Too Short, 8Ball & MJG. The album peaked at number 13 on the Billboard 200. Its lead single, "Gettin' Some", was certified platinum by the Recording Industry Association of America.

Critical reception

Block Music garnered positive reviews from music critics praising Shawnna's improvement as a rapper in terms of lyrical content and tonal delivery. Andy Kellman of AllMusic gave high praise to Shawnna's ability to portray different emotions and deliver topics with complex writing over energetic production, saying that, "With a surprising level of depth and a more complementary set of productions, Block Music makes Worth tha Weight – a decent album in its own right – seem like a clumsy warm-up." Alvin Blanco of XXL also commended Shawnna for side-stepping her usual sex-filled braggadocio to reveal more introspective material delivered in both hard-hitting and soft-spoken styles, concluding that "Offering up more of herself this go-round, Shawnna shows considerable growth. Maybe now she can finally get some… props."

Track listing

Charts

References

External links

2006 albums
Shawnna albums
Def Jam Recordings albums
Disturbing tha Peace albums
Albums produced by Salaam Remi
Albums produced by J.U.S.T.I.C.E. League